The Scleroderma Research Foundation (SRF) is a non-profit organization based in San Francisco that funds research into scleroderma. The SRF also funds and supports Scleroderma Centers of Excellence, including the Johns Hopkins Scleroderma Center.
 
Over 30 years, the SRF has raised millions of dollars for scleroderma research. The organization funds research based on review and recommendations by its Scientific Advisory Board.

The SRF website provides information on treatments, research and their signature fundraising event.

External links 

 Johns Hopkins Scleroderma Center
 Official website

Rheumatology organizations
Autoimmune disease organizations
Year of establishment missing